Tim Burton (born August 25, 1958) is an American film director, producer, artist, writer, animator, puppeteer, and actor. 

He is known for his gothic horror and fantasy films, such as Beetlejuice (1988), Edward Scissorhands (1990), The Nightmare Before Christmas (1993), Ed Wood (1994), Sleepy Hollow (1999), Corpse Bride (2005), Sweeney Todd: The Demon Barber of Fleet Street (2007), Dark Shadows (2012), and Frankenweenie (2012). 

He is also known for blockbuster films, such as the adventure-comedy Pee-wee's Big Adventure (1985), the superhero films Batman (1989) and Batman Returns (1992), the science fiction film Planet of the Apes (2001), the fantasy-drama Big Fish (2003), the musical adventure film Charlie and the Chocolate Factory (2005), the fantasy film Alice in Wonderland (2010), and film adaptations of Miss Peregrine's Home for Peculiar Children (2016) and Dumbo (2019).

Feature films

Producer only
 Cabin Boy (1994)
 Batman Forever (1995)
 James and the Giant Peach (1996)
 9 (2009)
 Abraham Lincoln: Vampire Hunter (2012)
 Alice Through the Looking Glass (2016)

Acting credits

Other credits

Short films

Television

Music videos

Commercials

Notes

References

External links 
 
 

Male actor filmographies
Director filmographies
Filmography
American filmographies